The following is a list of media in Minot, North Dakota, United States:

Minot has several media outlets but little local content.  Aside from some local news programming, virtually no mass media content originates from Minot. The local media tends to rebroadcast Bismarck television stations and republish network and wire reports rather than maintain a strong local focus.

Radio
Minot has 15 radio stations (12 FM, 3 AM). Bottineau-based Programmers Broadcasting owns KTZU and KWGO, along with KBTO of Bottineau. North Dakota Public Radio operates a full power FM station, a community broadcaster based in nearby Burlington, ND operates a low-power FM station, and the remainder are nonprofit Christian stations, of which only KHRT is based locally.
  
Clear Channel Communications owns the rest. In May 2007 it was announced that Clear Channel sold the Minot group to Dean Goodman's GoodRadio, LLC. It was confirmed on May 16, 2007 by filings made public with the FCC. Then in the next couple of months, GoodRadio's plans fell through when its financing group, American Securities Capital Partners, objected to the deal's $452 million cost.

AM band
910 KCJB - "91 Country" Country/Talk
1320 KHRT - "K-Heart" Gospel Music
1390 KRRZ - "Cars" Classic Hits

FM band
88.9 KMPR - Prairie Public
91.1 K220GC - HBN Radio Christian
91.9 K220GC - Air1 Christian
93.7 KIZZ - "Z94" CHR/Top 40
94.9 KTZU - "The Zoo" Classic rock
97.1 KYYX - "97 Kicks" Country
98.1 KOWW-LP - "The Cowlip" eclectic community broadcaster
99.9 KMXA-FM - "Mix 99.9" AC
100.7  KNDL - K-Love Christian
102.9 KWGO - "W-G-O" Country
104.1 KSAF-LP - 3ABN Radio Christian
105.3 KZPR - "The Fox" Mainstream Rock
106.9 KHRT - "K-Heart" Christian

Other stations
Additionally, the following stations are not based in Minot but generally have a clear signal into town:
550 AM KFYR - "K-Fire" from Bismarck (News/Talk/Sports)
710 AM KXMR - "The Fan" also from Bismarck (Sports)
1410 AM KDKT - "Fox Sports Radio 1410" also from Bismarck (Sports)
101.9 FM KBTO - "Sunny 101.9" from Bottineau (Country)

Television

Over the air
Minot has six television stations, most of which have ATSC (digital) transmitters:
6 KSRE - Prairie Public Television (PBS) (ATSC 15)
10 KMOT - NBC
13 KXMC - CBS
14 KMCY - ABC
21 K21GQ - The Church Channel
24 KNDM - Fox

Cable television
Midcontinent Communications provides cable service to the city of Minot and Minot Air Force Base. Souris River Telecommunications provides cable service to other nearby communities.

Print
The principal local newspaper is the Minot Daily News, which publishes seven days a week. The Minot State University student newspaper The Red & Green is published once a week (Thursdays) during the regular school year, but not during the summer months. Morgan Printing produces the Lunch Letter three days a week on a double-sided leaflet. There are also two weekly classified-ad publications, the Trading Post, printed by the Daily News, and The Finder, printed by the Bismarck Tribune. The Bismarck Tribune is available at several outlets in the city, as is The Forum, to a lesser extent.

Local news
KXMC-TV, KMOT-TV, and the Minot Daily News report on local news daily.  KCJB-AM, KHRT-AM, and Prairie Public have some local news content, but no active journalists.

See also
List of television stations in North Dakota

Minot
Minot, North Dakota
Minot
North Dakota-related lists